The Very Best Of: 25 Years 1987–2012 is a 2013 greatest hits album by Scottish rock duo The Proclaimers. Released on 9 July 2013, the two-disc compilation included songs from every Proclaimers studio album up to that point.

Content 
Spanning two compact discs, the compilation included material from the nine Proclaimers' albums from 1987's This Is the Story to 2012's Like Comedy.

Reception 

In a largely positive review, Timothy Monger of AllMusic remarked that fans "will thrill to the idea of having almost all of their favorites [...] together in one place". Stephen Unwin was more dismissive in the Daily Express, remarking that "their shtick is borderline cute but ultimately nothing more than a gimmick" and that while some songs, such as "Letter from America", were catchy, "the rest is just two guys who happened on a career based on not a lot".

Track listing 
All tracks written by Craig Reid and Charles Reid, except where noted.

Charts

Certifications

References 

2013 compilation albums
The Proclaimers albums